Sir Harold Paton Mitchell, 1st Baronet, JP, DL (21 May 1900 – 8 April 1983) was a British businessman and Conservative politician.

Background
Mitchell was born in Carnock, Fife, the eldest son of Alexander Mitchell and Meta Mary Graham Paton.

Political career
Mitchell represented Brentford and Chiswick in Parliament from 1931 to 1945.   He was created a Baronet, of Tulliallan in the County of Fife and of Luscar in the Province of Alberta in the Dominion of Canada, in September 1945, in recognition of his "political and public services". He was vice-chairman of the Conservative Party under Winston Churchill.  In the 1920s he was a member of Clackmannan Union Agricultural Society (vice-president from 1927).

Military service
When the Second World War broke out Mitchell served as a Liaison Officer with the Polish Army, then commanded the Welfare Office for the Anti-Aircraft Command. He was Honorary Colonel of the Scottish-based 61 Signal Regiment TAVR in 1963.

Business life
Mitchell was a director of a number of companies, including:

 London and North Eastern Railway Company,  
 The New Zealand and Australian Land Company Ltd; 
 The Ben Line Steamers (from 1925), 
 The Alloa Glass Works Company (from 1928), 
 The Stirling Brickworks (chairman), 
 The New Main Brick Works Ltd (from 1938) and 
 The Alloa Coal Company (from 1926).

In 1920 Mitchell invested in and turned round the failing Mountain Park Coal Company in Canada.  This company formed the core of the later Mitchell controlled company Luscar. He was an investor in the Globe and Phoenix Gold Mining Company Ltd. in Southern Africa.  He had extensive mining interests in Canada and the United States (Luscar). He left the United Kingdom after his mines and a railway he owned were nationalised after the Second World War circum 1947 and subsequently he refused to keep any of his money in there. Mitchell purchased Tulliallan Castle in 1923 from the estate of Sir James Sivewright (and sold it to the Scottish Home Department in 1950 for £9,100). He invested money in a game farm and afforestation projects on the estate. He also had a number of estates in Bermuda (his main residency in his later years), Jamaica, Honduras, Portugal, Fiji, Brazil and Guatemala.

Personal life
Mitchell married Mary Pringle in 1947. They had one daughter, Mary Jean Mitchell. Mitchell was an accomplished downhill skier (he published a book on the subject in 1931), one of his many leisure activities. He set up a pipe band competition in Alloa in the early 1930s. He became Joint Master of the Lauderdale Hunt (Roxburghshire) with his brother Alex on the death of their father in 1934. He maintained a stable of show horses before the Second World War.

In later life he became a lecturer and author on Caribbean subjects and wrote several books including two on Caribbean economics and politics in 1967. In 1974, Mitchell purchased the islands of Nananu-i-Cake and Mabua off the coast of Viti Levu, in Fiji.

Mitchell died in April 1983, aged 82, when the title became extinct. A foundation was set up with his money after his death. It funded various projects including renovation of Tulliallan Graveyard in Fife close to where he had once lived and a donation to University of St Andrews (there is a building named the Sir Harold Mitchell Building, housing part of the School of Biology).  Prospect College, St Mary, Jamaica is funded by the Mitchell Green Foundation, with awards named for Sir Harold, Lady Mitchell and Mary Jean Mitchell.

References

External links

	

1900 births
1983 deaths
Baronets in the Baronetage of the United Kingdom
Conservative Party (UK) MPs for English constituencies
Royal Corps of Signals officers
People from Fife
20th-century Scottish businesspeople
UK MPs 1931–1935
UK MPs 1935–1945